Yezid Sayigh (b. 1955) is a senior associate at the Carnegie Middle East Center in Beirut, Lebanon. Previously, he was a professor of Middle East Studies at the Department of War Studies at King's College London, a member of the Academic Board of the Gulf Research Center, and a member of the board of trustees of the Palestinian Center for Policy and Survey Research (PCPSR). From 1994 to 2003, he was the assistant director of studies at the Centre of International Studies at Cambridge University. Sayigh also headed the Middle East Research Programme of the International Institute for Strategic Studies (IISS) in London from 1998 to 2003. Sayigh was a negotiator of the 1994 Gaza–Jericho Agreement between the Palestine Liberation Organisation and Israel. He headed the Palestinian delegation to the Multilateral Working Group on Arms Control and Regional Security (1992-1994), and was a MacArthur Scholar and Research Fellow at St Antony's College, Oxford (1990-1994). From 2005 to 2006, Sayigh was a visiting professor at the faculty of Political Studies and Public Administration at the American University of Beirut.

Biography
Sayigh's father, Yusif A. Sayigh (1916-2004), was born in al-Bassa, Palestine before the start of the British Mandate. His mother is Briton Rosemary Sayigh.
Sayigh has obtained a BSc in chemistry from the American University of Beirut, and a PhD in War Studies from King's College London.  He has also conducted research at the Dayan Center at Tel Aviv University. He speaks Arabic, English and French.

Public lectures
"Different Yet Similar: Governance in the West Bank and Gaza." Lecture given at the Palestine Center (Washington DC); watch video or read transcripts at http://www.thejerusalemfund.org/ht/d/ContentDetails/i/9924

Publications
His publications include: 
Armed Struggle and the Search for a State: The Palestinian National Movement, 1949-1993 (1997); 
The Third World Beyond the Cold War: Continuity and Change By Louise L'Estrange Fawcett, Louise Fawcett, Yazīd Ṣāyigh Contributor Louise L'Estrange Fawcett, Yazīd Ṣāyigh Published by Oxford University Press, 1999 
The Cold War and the Middle East By Yezid Sayigh, Avi Shlaim Contributor Yezid Sayigh, Avi Shlaim Published by Oxford University Press, 1997 

He has written numerous articles for national newspapers, academic and policy journals.

A political minefield by Yezid Sayigh
The PLO and the Palestinian Armed Struggle.

Footnotes

1955 births
Living people
Palestinian academics
Palestinian refugees
20th-century Palestinian historians
Alumni of King's College London
Academics of King's College London
Academic staff of the American University of Beirut
21st-century Palestinian historians